Willie Murphy (born 1944 in Wexford, Ireland) is a retired Irish sportsperson.  He played hurling with his local club Faythe Harriers and with the Wexford senior inter-county team  from 1965 until 1979.

References

1944 births
Living people
Faythe Harriers hurlers
Wexford inter-county hurlers
All-Ireland Senior Hurling Championship winners